Richard Movitz (December 10, 1925 – May 13, 2010) was an American alpine skier. He competed in the men's downhill at the 1948 Winter Olympics.

References

External links
 

1925 births
2010 deaths
American male alpine skiers
Olympic alpine skiers of the United States
Alpine skiers at the 1948 Winter Olympics
Skiers from Salt Lake City